The Villains of Valley View is an American comedy television series created by Chris Peterson and Bryan Moore that premiered on Disney Channel on June 3, 2022. The series stars Isabella Pappas, Malachi Barton, Reed Horstmann, Kayden Muller-Janssen, James Patrick Stuart, and Lucy Davis.

Plot 
Vic is a mad scientist who is married to the electrical supervillain Eva. They have three children named Amy, Jake and Colby and were part of a villain group called the League of Villains that was led by the evil Onyx and operated in the city of Centropolis. When Onyx passes Surge over for a promotion to Chief Commander which he gives to Slither, Amy tries to get Onyx to reconsider to no avail which followed with Onyx insulting her family. Amy attacks Onyx in retaliation and her family goes on the run. They eventually settle in Valley View, Texas, under the alias of the Madden family. The Madden family work to maintain their ordinary lives while trying to keep themselves from being found by the authorities, the superheroes, and Onyx's minions while befriending their landlady's granddaughter Hartley.

Cast

Main 
 Isabella Pappas as Amy / Havoc, a teenage supervillain with sonic powers, who stands up to the head of the League of Villains, forcing her family to go on the run
 Malachi Barton as Colby / Flashform, Amy and Jake's younger brother who gains shapeshifting abilities after turning thirteen. He was originally named "Number 3" before getting a name. In "Showdown at the Round Up", Colby later develops super-speed and invisibility. In "A Superhero in Valley View", Colby develops regeneration where he can regrow lost body parts. In "Bad Energy", Colby develops kinetic manipulation. Barton also voices Colby when he is in different forms.
 Reed Horstmann as Jake / Chaos, Amy's brother with super strength who wants to become a better person
 Kayden Muller-Janssen as Hartley, the Maddens' neighbor and Amy's best friend who learns that the Maddens are supervillains
 James Patrick Stuart as Vic / Kraniac, Amy's father and a mad scientist with genius-level intellect who makes gadgets. In his civilian form, Vic becomes the substitute teacher of Valley View High School.
 Lucy Davis as Eva / Surge, Amy's mother with the power to manipulate electricity, who was working to become the Chief Commander of the League of Villains only for Onyx to give it to Slither

Recurring 

 Patricia Belcher as Celia, Hartley's grandmother and the Maddens' landlady
 Mariah Iman Wilson as Starling, a teenage superhero with flight and time-freezing abilities who is Havoc's nemesis. The episode "A Superhero in Valley View" reveals that Starling's true identity is Judith.

Production 
On December 10, 2021, it was announced that Disney Channel had begun production in Los Angeles on Meet the Mayhems, originally scheduled to premiere in summer 2022. The series was created by Chris Peterson and Bryan Moore, who also serve as executive producers and showrunners. On April 28, 2022, it was announced that the series, under the new title of The Villains of Valley View, would premiere on June 3, 2022. On August 23, 2022, the series was renewed for a second season.

Episodes

Ratings 
 
}}

Notes

References

External links 
 
 

2020s American children's comedy television series
2022 American television series debuts
Television series by It's a Laugh Productions
Disney Channel original programming
English-language television shows
Supervillain television shows